In November Sunlight is the debut studio album by the instrumental band Soko, released on December 17, 1996. This is the only album with John Gilmore as a member of the band, who left the band after the album, turning Soko into a duo, although he did perform as a guest on the following album. Seven of the nine tracks on the album have guest musicians, and three of the four guests are associated with the Dave Matthews Band: Dave Matthews, LeRoi Moore and Tim Reynolds. The fourth, the percussionist Darrell Rose, created the album's artwork. The entire album is instrumental with the exception of the end of  "Jiriki", which has vocals by Matthews.

Track listing

Personnel
Soko
Michael Sokolowski – piano, synthesizers, violin
Houston Ross – bass guitar
John Gilmore – drums

Guest musicians
Tim Reynolds – electric guitar
Darrell Rose – percussion
Dave Matthews – vocals
LeRoi Moore – saxophone

References

External links
Soko recordings – Soko's official website
In November Sunlight – Breezeway Records website

1996 debut albums
Sokoband albums
Breezeway Records albums
Dave Matthews Band